Wolfgang Müller (born 10 August 1953 in Cologne, West Germany) is a German television actor. He played several roles in the very popular TV series Derrick.

Selected filmography

External links

Experts Agency Munich 

1953 births
Living people
German male television actors
20th-century German male actors
21st-century German male actors
Actors from Cologne